Lepidostroma is a genus in the family Lepidostromataceae (the only family within the fungal order Lepidostromatales). The genus is distinguished from all other lichenized clavarioid fungi (Multiclavula (Cantharellales), Ertzia (Lepidostromatales), and Sulzbacheromyces (Lepidostromatales)) by having a distinctly squamulose thallus (similar to a 'Coriscium-type' thallus) with scattered to dense rounded to reniform squamules. Four species are known from the tropics of Africa and the Americas.

References

Agaricomycetes genera
Agaricomycetes
Basidiolichens
Lichen genera